The Jaffery Sports Club Ground is a  cricket ground situated in Nairobi, Kenya. It hosted its first ODI international during the 2007 World Cricket League in Kenya.

The Ground is owned by a sect of the Muslim community in Nairobi. Hence most of the players in the Club team are Islamic. This club plays host to the matches of the Nairobi Jaffery Sports Club from the Nairobi Provincial Cricket Association. Many of the young players from the cricket team have gone on to represent Kenya at various levels including Kenya, Kenya 'A', and at junior levels. A few players from this club have also gone on to represent different teams at the Sahara Elite League. A few of these players include Charles Obuya (Eastern Aces), and Ashwin Prabhakar (Southern Stars, Kenya 'A').

List of Centuries

One Day Internationals

List of Five Wicket Hauls

One Day Internationals

References

Cricinfo ground page 

Sport in Nairobi
Cricket grounds in Kenya